Smętówko may refer to the following places in Poland:

 Smętówko, Greater Poland Voivodeship
 Smętówko, Pomeranian Voivodeship